The West Africa Regional Rail Integration is a proposal to connect up isolated railway networks in West Africa.

Overview
In 2009, USTDA approved funding of $750,000 for a feasibility study grant to assist the Union économique et monétaire ouest-africaine (UEMOA), in determining the technical and economic viability of developing a rail line from Bamako, Mali to Mali's southeastern border with Côte d’Ivoire, as well as its associated costs, design and construction criteria, and implementation plan. The study will also include a technical assessment on the existing rail line between Dakar, Senegal and Bamako, which would be linked to the proposed rail line. The total cost of the proposed line is expected to exceed $1.9 billion.

The 15-month railway study USTDA contract was authorised to begin in October 2010.  ZETA-TECH Associates of Cherry Hill NJ (NOW Harsco Rail Intelligent Solutions) undertook the study with other companies assisting, including the Law Offices of Peter C. Hansen, LLC, which analysed the existing legal framework and drafted a treaty to modernise the ownership structure and facilitate long-term financing of the revitalised railway. A final report was delivered in December 2012, and a French translated copy was accepted by UEMOA in March 2013.

Timeline

2011 

 On 31 November 2011, an agreement was signed to build a new international railway connecting Côte d'Ivoire, Burkino Faso, Niger and Benin.

No progress was reported on that announcement as of the summer of 2012.

In October 2012 UEMOA held a meeting to at its Burkina Faso headquarters to review and discuss a draft report on the USTDA funded rail project.  The consulting team presented four different capital cost modernisation plans.  One would be for just minimum safety changes.  The most ambitious plan would support a possible 10 million ton modernised standard gauge conversion rail project, with the earliest train operations occurring sometime around 2017 between Dakar and Bamako.  The requirements would include an integrated plan of execution with mine + rail + port + a new Railway 2-nation Authority, if the project consultant suggestions are followed.  Building just the railway without integrating these other transport and customer commercial actions was recommended as a critical process for moving towards a final total plan.

The Bamako to the south railway corridor has a separate set of competitive issues and technical costs associated with it.

The consultant team also projected the possible Pro Forma Income Statement for three of the possible railway operating company levels of modernisation. Contact UEMOA or the consultants for further information as to the capital costs, possible operating scenarios, and economic outcomes.

A complete Critical Path for debating and then making project decisions (given the many technical choices) and then executing project funding and bidding and construction was also submitted to UEMOA by the consultant team.  As of mid October 2012 that process was just starting at a technical review level under the guidance of UEMOA staff.

A PowerPoint presentation that summarised the technical results and possible financial or Pro Forma operating income of the upgraded Dakar to Bamako railway was presented to The Corporate Council of Africa in Washington in mid-February 2013.  Among the items discussed was the calculated cost of 1) a modern meter gauge railway service as requested by a UEMOA rail task force "solution" and 2) the cost of a conversion to a standard gauge between Dakar and Bamako.  The project capital costs together with the estimated cost of rail operation plus the cost of repaying the capital infrastructure debt were identified in a Pro Forma Income Statement for the improved railway enterprise (a designed railway company) at a given future year 2017 tonnage.  The project design was built around an attempt to resolve for the lowest possible bulk cargo rates to reach a new proposed bulk cargo port south of Dakar.  The target rate was <$32 a metric ton at standard gauge and somewhat higher at meter gauge. This pro forma analysis shows evidence that the railway can be independently financed by investors without the need of a Senegal or a Mali mine company actual railway "ownership" (a burden to the mine company Balance Sheet).  A railway authority is recommended as a means of attracting private capital using the bonding and commercial structure of such a government of Senegal and Mali chartered body rather than a conventional concession approach. The railway feasibility was based on a variety of engineering and economic possible designs that used different rail mode market shares and different levels of railway operating efficiency (operating ratios) and different track structure safety standards. Naturally, the local African leaders will have to make the final design choices.  From an economic point of view, subsidies and doners are not necessary if the traffic market share and the engineering and train operational designs are correctly matched.
USTDA financed 
The next step is for the large shippers to meet collectively or individually with UEMOA and test the feasibility study against their specific (and often private) shipper requirements. Either the authors or UEMOA should be contacted.  In the meantime, rail service is continuing in the corridor under the existing concession arrangement.

During February 2013 the report was translated into French.  Contact UEMOA or Harsco Rail Zeta Tech or USTDA for further information.

Harsco Rail Zeta Tech; Jim Blaze Project Director

2014 

 Study

2015 

 Construction starts on extension of railway in Benin to Niger. Both are  gauge. The existing railway in Benin will be upgraded.

2017 

 Proposal for standard gauge rail line stretching from Parakou, Benin to Ilorin, Nigeria

2018 

 About 120 km of the new missing link has been completed, from Niamey towards the Benin border. Link
 Niger-Ivory Coast Metre gauge.

2019 
 Dual gauge sleepers in Ghana start to be able to suit conversion to standard gauge in future.

Maps

Nigeria 
 UN Map
 UNHCR Atlas Map
 Railway stations in Nigeria

Benin 
 UN Map
 CIA Map of Benin
 UNHCR Map of Benin
 UNHCR Atlas Map
 Railway stations in Benin (*)

Togo 
 UN Map GH - covers 95% of Togo
 UNECA Map
 UNHCR Map - includes yet to be built railways
 UNHCR Atlas Map
 Railway stations in Togo (*)

Ghana 
 UN Map Ghana
 UNHCR Atlas Map Ghana
 GhanaNet Map
 UNHCR Atlas Map
 Railway stations in Ghana (*)

Niger 
 UN Map
 UNHCR Map NIG
 Map
 Railway stations in Niger (*)

Burkina Faso 
 UN Map (no longer shows railway lines).
 UNHCR Map
 UNHCR Atlas Map
 Railway stations in Burkina Faso (*)

Ivory Coast  
 UN Map
 UNHCR Atlas Map Côte d'Ivoire
 Railway stations in Ivory Coast (*)

Liberia  
 UN Map
 Railway stations in Liberia (*)

Sierra Leone  
 UN Map of Sierra Leone - no railways shown at all.
 UNHCR Atlas map
 Railway stations in Sierra Leone (*)

Guinea  
 UN Map
 UNHCR Atlas Map (2005)
 UNHCR Atlas Map (2004)
 Railway stations in Guinea (*)

Mali  
 UN Map
 UNHCR Map
 Railway stations in Mali (*)

Senegal  
 UN Map
 Go
 Railway stations in Senegal (*)

See also 

 ECOWAS rail
 AfricaRail is an earlier and similar scheme.
 Dakar-Niger Railway
 Rail transport in Côte d'Ivoire
 Transport in Burkina Faso
 Rail transport in Mali
 Rail transport in Senegal
 Railway stations in Mali

References

External links
 ustda
 DGMarket
 Map West Africa
  Zetatech

Rail transport in Africa